Harkamaya College of Education is a private teachers' training college in Gangtok, Sikkim under Sikkim University. The college offers Bachelor of Education and Master of Education degrees.

History of the College
The college was founded in 2003, and was initially affiliated to North Bengal University in West Bengal, due to the absence of a Central University in Sikkim at the time. In 2006, the college became the first institution in the state of Sikkim to offer the Master of Education degree. After the establishment of a Central University in Sikkim, the college became affiliated to Sikkim University. The college gained NAAC accreditation in 2011.

Accreditation
Harkamaya College of Education is accredited by the National Assessment and Accreditation Council (NAAC), and its degrees are awarded by Sikkim University. The college's B.Ed. and M.Ed. programmes are also recognized by the National Council for Teacher Education (NCTE).

References

External links
 Harkamaya College of Education

Colleges of education in India
Colleges affiliated to Sikkim University
Universities and colleges in Sikkim
Gangtok
Educational institutions established in 2003
2003 establishments in Sikkim